"Beggin for Thread" is a song recorded by American singer and songwriter Banks for her debut studio album, Goddess (2014). It was released as the album's fourth single on July 22, 2014, by Harvest Records. The song was written by Banks, Jesse Rogg, and Tim Anderson, and produced by the latter two.

"Beggin for Thread" garnered moderate chart success upon its release. In the United States, it peaked at number 11 on the Billboard Alternative Songs chart. Internationally, it charted in Germany and Australia at numbers 64 and 80, respectively. The song made its live television debut when Banks performed it on ABC's Jimmy Kimmel Live on August 4, 2014.

Commercial performance
In the United States, "Beggin for Thread" debuted at number 33 on the US Alternative Songs chart during the week of September 29, 2014. It later peaked at number 11 on the chart on December 27, 2014. The song continued to enjoy moderate success when it debuted at number 39 on Mediabase's Adult Top 40.

The track was ranked 27th for the Triple J Hottest 100, 2014.

Music video
An accompanying music video for the song was directed by Barnaby Roper and released on July 29, 2014. It depicts Banks in a black and white background setting while being surrounded by male background dancers.

Live performances
On August 7, 2014, Banks made her late-night television debut on ABC's Jimmy Kimmel Live, where she performed the song along with "Waiting Game". On April 3, 2015, she performed "Beggin for Thread" on The Late Show with David Letterman.

Charts

Weekly charts

Year-end charts

Certifications

Release history

References

External links
 

2014 singles
2014 songs
Banks (singer) songs
Black-and-white music videos
Harvest Records singles
Songs written by Jesse Rogg
Songs written by Banks (singer)
Songs written by Tim Anderson (musician)